The 2012 Veikkausliiga is the 82nd season of top-tier football in Finland. It began on 15 April 2012 and ended on 27 October 2012. HJK Helsinki were the defending champions and successfully defended their title.

Teams
RoPS were relegated to Ykkönen after finishing at the bottom of the 2011 season. Their place was taken by Ykkönen champions FC Lahti.

Team summaries

1 Paavo Nurmi Stadion until June 2012.

Managerial changes

League table

Results

Matches 1–22

Matches 23–33

Statistics
Updated to games played on 27 October 2012.

Top scorers
Source: veikkausliiga.com

Top assists
Source: veikkausliiga.com

Monthly awards

Annual awards
Source: Pelipaikkojen parhaat 2012 nimetty

See also
 2012 Finnish Cup
 2012 Finnish League Cup
 2012 Ykkönen
 2012 Kakkonen

References

External links
 Official site 
 uefa.com

2011
1
Fin
Fin